Khawaja Shamsuddin Azeemi (born 17 October 1927) is a Pakistani scholar in the field of spiritualism and a Sufi master. He is the current head of the Azeemia Sufi order. He has written books on the subject of spirituality or Muraqaba and is the chief editor of the monthly Roohani Digest and Qalander Shaoor in Karachi, Pakistan. Moreover, he has established a chain of fifty-three meditation halls worldwide.

Family 
Azeemi's father was Anis Ahmed Ansari and mother was Umat-ur-Rehman. He is descended from Abu Ayyub al-Ansari, a close companion of the Islamic prophet Muhammad and his host during Muhammad's to Medina.

Publications

 Lectures on Parapsychology (1994)
 Muraqaba: The Art and Science of Sufi Meditation (2005)
 Journey Towards Insight by Sufi Teacher (2009)
 Colour Therapy (2009)
 Spiritual Prayer (2009)
 Qalander Baba Auliya: Spiritual Leader of 20th Century (2010)
 Muhammad: Life of the Prophet and Scientific Interpretations of His Miracles (2011)
 Muhammad (PBUH): The Prophet of God

See also
Qalandar Baba Auliya
Silsila Azeemiyya
Tajuddin Muhammad Badruddin
Chromotherapy

References

External links 
https://www.iseek.online/ur/books/

Pakistani Sufi religious leaders
20th-century Muslim scholars of Islam
Pakistani scholars
Muhajir people
1927 births
Pakistani Sufis
People from Saharanpur district
Pakistani philosophers
Urdu-language writers
Indian Sufis
Living people
Sufi teachers
Spiritual teachers